Anastasia Sidiropoulou (Greek: Αναστασία Σιδηροπούλου; born October 28, 1992) is a Greek model and beauty pageant titleholder who was crowned Star Hellas 2013 and represented her country at the Miss Universe 2013 pageant.

She studied dentistry in Comenius University in Bratislava, Slovakia and specialized in orthodontics.

Early life
Anastasia is the daughter of Dr. Nikos Sidiropoulos. Her parents are both dentists. She is studying dentistry in Bratislava.

Miss Young 2010
Anastasia was previously "Miss Young 2010" (Miss Teen Greece).

Miss Teen World 2011
Anastasia Sidiropoulou then became Miss Teen World 2011, which took place in Houston, on Friday, August 13, 2010. She beat 24 other teenagers from around the world to win the sash and title.

References

External links
Miss Universe Greece 2013
Official Star Hellas website
https://www1.pluska.sk/soubiznis/zahranicny-soubiznis/anastasia-sidiropoulou-najde-frajera-slovaka

Living people
Greek beauty pageant winners
Greek dentists
Miss Universe 2013 contestants
1992 births
Models from Athens
People in health professions from Athens